The Faculty of Fine Arts of Pontevedra is a Spanish art faculty founded in 1990 in Pontevedra. It is housed in the former Maestranza and Saint Ferdinand Barracks, an neoclassical  building from the early 20th century in the city of Pontevedra, Spain. It is the only Faculty of Fine Arts in Galicia and northwestern Spain.

Location 
The building is located at 2, Maestranza Street in Pontevedra.

History 
In the eighties of the 20th century, several art teachers led by Professor José Roselló Valle, as well as politicians of the time, such as the person in charge of culture of the Provincial Council of Pontevedra, Adriano Marques, fought and made multiple steps and efforts so that the city would have a Faculty of Fine Arts in the project for the creation of the future university, which was to be called University of Southern Galicia.

The Faculty of Fine Arts of Pontevedra was created in 1990 by Decree 416/1990, of 31 July, of the Ministry of Education and University Planning, in its article 14. The first programme was validated on 9 July 1990 and the programme of the University of Salamanca was adopted for the Faculty of Pontevedra, published for the first and second cycle of the curriculum in the Official State Bulletins of 20 July 1983 and 17 March 1987.

For the first four years, the Faculty of Fine Arts was provisionally housed in the former Provincial Hospice in Sierra Street, with a certain precariousness in terms of material means and space.

On 15 December 1994, the Faculty moved to its current location, the building of the former Saint Ferdinand Barracks, in the city centre, after a project to acquire and renovate the building: different departments of the Xunta de Galicia, the City Council of Pontevedra and the University provided the money to buy the building and the Provincial Council of Pontevedra financed the renovation work. According to the mayor at the time, Javier Cobián, the total project cost 2,000 million pesetas.

From the beginning, there was a great interaction between the students of the faculty and the city of Pontevedra, with installations, performances and artworks in the streets.

The patron saint of the faculty is Saint Ero and the faculty celebrates his feast day in May.

Programmes 
The faculty awards the University Degree in Fine Arts. The centre also hosts the Master's degree in Fashion Design and Creative Direction and the PhD in Creation and Research in Contemporary Art.

Facilities 
The large building of the faculty is the former neoclassical Saint Ferdinand Barracks, designed by the architect Bonifacio Menéndez Conde, built between 1906 and 1909 and renovated in 1994 by the architect César Portela Fernández-Jardón to become the headquarters of the faculty and to house the Fine Arts studies.

The faculty has an exhibition room, the X Room, located at the entrance of the building.

The faculty's library has 55 periodical titles and over 10,000 volumes and has 108 reading places.

The faculty also has multi-purpose workshops, equipped with hand tools and specific machines (workshops for metal, wood, ceramics, plastic and other materials).

There is also an audiovisual laboratory, other laboratories for graphic techniques (intaglio) and photography and a computer room (for digital and 3D image processing and digital photographic processing).

Deans 
So far the deans of the faculty have been:     
 1990 : Juan Fernando de Laiglesia González de Peredo
 1994 : José Chavete Rodríguez
 1999 : Jesús Hernández Sánchez
 2006 : Ignacio Barcia Rodríguez
 2011 : Juan Carlos Meana Martínez
 2015 : Silvia García González
 2019 : Xosé Manuel Buxán Bran

Gallery

References

See also

Bibliography 
 De la Puerta, José María; Patio de las musas. Facultad de Bellas Artes de Pontevedra, Arquitectura Viva, number 43. Madrid 1995. .

Related articles 
 Saint Ferdinand Barracks
 Higher School for the Conservation and Restoration of Cultural Property in Galicia
 Pontevedra Campus
 Faculty of Communication of Pontevedra

External links 
  Former Saint Ferdinand barracks website
  Faculty of Fine Arts of Pontevedra website
  Renovation of the Saint-Ferdinand barracks for the Faculty of Fine Arts.

Neoclassical architecture
Arts in Spain
Art schools in Spain
Pontevedra Campus
Universities in Galicia (Spain)
Buildings and structures in Pontevedra
Educational institutions established in 1990
1990 establishments in Spain
Education in Pontevedra